Oryzias javanicus, the Javanese ricefish, is a small species of fish in the family Adrianichthyidae. It lives in Peninsular Thailand, Malaysia, Singapore, and Indonesia (Java, Sumatra, Borneo, Sulawesi, Bali and Lombok), where it can be seen in both brackish and fresh water in ponds, ditches, mangrove, swamps, streams and canals.

References

javanicus
Freshwater fish of Indonesia
Freshwater fish of Malaysia
Fish of Thailand
Taxa named by Pieter Bleeker 
Fish described in 1854